Tom Pecora (born January 21, 1958) is an American college basketball coach. Pecora was hired as associate head coach at Quinnipiac on March 28, 2017 under new head coach Baker Dunleavy.

Pecora, a veteran with 14 years of experience as a head coach at the Division I level, enters his third season at Quinnipiac in 2019–20. Born in Queens Village, New York, he graduated from Adelphi University in 1983.

He has 198 wins as a Head Coach at the Division I level (Hofstra, Fordham), and 261 wins in his career as a collegiate coach.

Pecora was promoted to the position of head coach at Hofstra University in 2001, taking over for Jay Wright. Following his time at Hofstra, Pecora took over as the permanent replacement at Fordham University after the program fired Dereck Whittenburg during the 2009–10 season.

Pecora served as the head coach at Hofstra for nine years (2001-2010) and at Fordham for five seasons (2010–15). Prior to taking over the head coaching position at Hofstra, Pecora served as the associate head coach under Jay Wright for seven seasons, the last two of which resulted in America East Conference titles and NCAA Tournament berths.

As a head coach at Hofstra, he compiled a 155–126 mark in nine seasons, leading the Pride to four postseason appearances (three NIT and one CBI), more than any team in  New York City over that nine-year span. In 16 years at Hofstra with Pecora on the staff (nine years as a head coach, seven as an assistant), the Pride averaged 19 wins a season (246-161).

During his time in Hempstead, Hofstra was the winningest program in the Metropolitan New York area. Over his last six years, Hofstra won 121 games, including four 20-win seasons. In 2006 and 2009, he was named Coach of the Year by the Metropolitan Basketball Writers Association (MBWA) and he also received regional Coach of the Year honors from the National Association of Basketball Coaches (NABC) and the Basketball Coaches Association of New York (BCANY).

Pecora also had tremendous success in developing guards while at Hofstra. As an assistant, he recruited NBA guards Speedy Claxton and Norman Richardson, while as a head coach, he recruited three guards who scored over 2,000 career points: Loren Stokes, Antoine Agudio and Charles Jenkins. Claxton, Richardson, Stokes and Jenkins all won their conference Player of the Year Awards, while Jenkins also played in the NBA for the Golden State Warriors and Philadelphia 76ers.

Over his entire collegiate basketball coaching career, Pecora has a student-athlete graduation rate of 100 percent.

Division I Head Coaching Record

References

1958 births
Living people
Adelphi University alumni
American men's basketball coaches
Basketball coaches from New York (state)
College men's basketball head coaches in the United States
Farmingdale State Rams men's basketball coaches
Fordham Rams men's basketball coaches
High school basketball coaches in the United States
Hofstra Pride men's basketball coaches
Loyola Marymount Lions men's basketball coaches
Sportspeople from Queens, New York
UNLV Runnin' Rebels basketball coaches